Munni Begum may refer to:

 Munni Begum, Pakistani ghazal singer
 Munni Begum (noble) (1720–1813), second wife of the Nawab of Bengal, Mir Jafar